The Konner K1 is an Italian helicopter designed and produced by Konner Srl of Amaro, Friuli. The aircraft is supplied complete and ready-to-fly.

Design and development
The K1 was designed to comply with the European Class 6 microlight helicopter rules. It features a single main rotor and tail rotor, a two-seats-in side-by-side configuration enclosed cockpit with a windshield, skid landing gear and a  Konner TK-250 turboshaft engine.

The aircraft fuselage is made from carbon fibre.

The Konner TK-250 turboshaft engine includes full FADEC control that uses only three positions: stop, idle and flight. The powerplant weighs only  and will burn JP-1, JP-4, diesel fuel or biodiesel.

The design has an electrical power system to aid autorotation in the event of main engine loss in flight.

Specifications (K1)

See also
List of rotorcraft

References

External links

K1
2010s Italian sport aircraft
2010s Italian ultralight aircraft
2010s Italian civil utility aircraft
2010s Italian helicopters